The CEELI Institute is an independent, non-profit, non-governmental organization for advancing the rule of law. It was founded in 1999 and located at the Villa Grebovka, Prague, Czech Republic. In July 2022, Russia designated CEELI Institute as an "undesirable organisation".

Mission 
The CEELI Institute's mission is to advance the rule of law across various countries in order to protect fundamental rights and individual liberties, promote transparent, incorruptible, accountable governments, create the foundation for economic growth and development, and promote peaceful resolution of disputes. Through innovative training programs, the CEELI Institute educates legal professionals with a focus on providing tools to promote human rights, strengthen democratic institutions, fight corruption, and support free market economies.

Programs 

The program instructors at the Institute are international professionals committed to advancing the rule of law. CEELI also works with judges and reformers in countries in transition to support fair, transparent, and effective judicial systems, strengthen democratic institutions, build respect for human rights, and promote the continuing development of market economies. The  instructors hold training programs designed to target the needs of the participants. The institute has worked with more than 2/500 lawyers from over 40 countries.

The Conference of Chief Justices in Central and Eastern Europe is an organization made up of the Supreme Chief Court Justices in twenty-three nations. The Conference was launched in Prague at the Institute in 2011, and  meets annually. In October 2015, the Conference met in Croatia and signed the Statement of Principles of the Independence of the Judiciary, also known as the Brijuni Statement,  an important reaffirmation of the fundamental principles of judicial independence and integrity.

In 2012, CEELI Institute created the Central and Eastern European Judicial Exchange Network for younger, less experienced judges. Today, the network consists of over 80 judges and court administrators from 19 countries in central and eastern Europe. Similar to the Conference, the network focuses on promoting judicial integrity in the nations. The Institute organizes events for the network to ensure the growth of a supportive peer exchange system. The judges in the Network compiled over 130 judiciary-related international standards in their  "Manual Independence, Impartiality, and Integrity of Justice: A Thematic Compilation of International Standards, Policies, and Best Practices".

The Institute began working with Tunisia in 2012, to train over 2,100 Tunisian judges about judiciary rule in democracies. The program in Tunisia is funded by the Swedish International Development Agency, and partners with the International Legal Assistance Consortium, and the International Bar Association. The program holds bi-monthly training sessions, run by the Institute and the IBA, to educate judges about professional skills and public appeal. The Tunisian Anti-Corruption Agency began in 2014. The Institute and partnering organizations started a program to train the Agency about the development and implementation of prosecution cases. Samir Annabi, a Tunisian lawyer, leads the Agency in effort to combat corruption.

References 

Non-profit organizations based in the Czech Republic
Undesirable organizations in Russia
Organizations established in 1999